The 1905 Los Angeles Angels season was the third season for the Los Angeles Angels playing in the Pacific Coast League (PCL).  The Angels compiled a 120–94 record and won the PCL pennant. They defeated the Tacoma Tigers, five games to one, in the PCL championship series. Jim Morley was the team's manager and owner, and Pop Dillon was the team captain. The team played its home games at Chutes Park and Prager Park in Los Angeles.

1905 PCL standings

Statistics

Batting 
Note: Pos = Position; G = Games played; AB = At bats; H = Hits; Avg. = Batting average; HR = Home runs; SLG = Slugging percentage

Pitching 
Note: G = Games pitched; IP = Innings pitched; W = Wins; L = Losses; PCT = Win percentage; ERA = Earned run average; SO = Strikeouts

References

Further reading
 "The Greatest Minor League: A History of the Pacific Coast League, 1903-1957", by Dennis Snelling (McFarland 2011)
 "The Los Angeles Angels of the Pacific Coast League: A History, 1903-1957", by Richard Beverage (McFarland 2011)

1905 in sports in California
Pacific Coast League seasons